Siemnice is a village in the administrative district of Gmina Rachanie, within Tomaszów Lubelski County, Lublin Voivodeship, in eastern Poland.

The village has a population of 390.

History
In 1942, about 70 people of Jewish origin, including elder people and children, were shot.

References

Siemnice
Holocaust locations in Poland